House of Cards (Spanish:Castillo de naipes) is a 1943 Spanish comedy film directed by Jerónimo Mihura and starring Blanca de Silos, Raúl Cancio and Manolo Morán.

Cast
  Blanca de Silos as Carmen  
 Raúl Cancio as Luis  
 Manolo Morán as Paco  
 Camino Garrigó as Abuela  
 Joaquín Roa as José  
 José Alburquerque as Notario  
 José Portes as Don Fermín  
 Josefina Ragel as Criadita  
 Félix Fernandez as Editor  
 Concha López Silva as Cocinera  
 David Kilgore as Mister X  
 Eduardo Álvaro as Conserje editorial  
 Eugenio García as Médico  
 Pilar Santisteban as Muchacha 
 Amelia Merino as Amiga de Carmen  
 Carmita Garcia as Dancer

References

Bibliography
 Labanyi, Jo & Pavlović, Tatjana. A Companion to Spanish Cinema. John Wiley & Sons, 2012.

External links 

1943 films
1943 comedy films
Spanish comedy films
1940s Spanish-language films
Films directed by Jerónimo Mihura
Films scored by Juan Quintero Muñoz
Spanish black-and-white films
1940s Spanish films